The Paintsville Herald is a semi-weekly newspaper (printed on Wednesdays and Fridays) covering the city of Paintsville, Kentucky, and the surrounding communities in Johnson County,  Kentucky.
The newspaper was first published on May 2, 1901.

References

External links
Lancaster Management

Newspapers published in Kentucky
Johnson County, Kentucky
Paintsville, Kentucky